National Archives of Korea is an agency of South Korean government, charged with preserving government-produced articles and records. It is headquartered in Government Complex Daejeon and has branches in Busan and Seongnam, and an office in Seoul.

Key tasks include establishment of the basic policies and improvement of system for the records management, establishment of the standardization policy for the records management and development and operation of the standards for the records management, drafting and management of the statistics on and related to the records management, establishment and standardization of the electronic management system for records, research and propagation of the management methods and records preservation technology, education and training of staffs associated with the records management, guidance, supervision and evaluation of the records management, liaison and collaboration with other records management institutions, and exchange and cooperation on records management, etc.

Its English title used to be the National Archives and Records Service until September 18, 2007.

See also 
 List of national archives
 Ministry of the Interior (South Korea)

External links
 Official website
 English website
 Nara Repository in Seongnam city
 History Repository in Busan metropolitan city
 Presidential Archives in Seongnam city
 National Archives Portal

Archives in South Korea
Government agencies of South Korea
South Korea